Waqas Barkat (born 17 February 1990) is a Pakistani-born Hong Kong cricketer.  Barkat is a right-handed batsman who fields as a wicket-keeper.  He was born in Rawalpindi, Punjab.

Having played age group cricket for Hong Kong Under-19s in the 2010 Under-19 World Cup, he proceeded to make his World Cricket League debut for Hong Kong in the 2011 World Cricket League Division Three, where he helped Hong Kong earn promotion to 2011 World Cricket League Division Two.  It was in this tournament that he made his List A debut against Uganda.  He played 5 further List A matches in the competition, the last coming against Papua New Guinea.  In his 6 matches, he scored 49 runs at a batting average of 8.16, with a high score of 25.  Behind the stumps he took 9 catches and made 3 stumpings.

He made his One Day International debut against Afghanistan in the 2014 ACC Premier League on 1 May 2014.

In September 2019, he was named in Hong Kong's squad for the 2019 ICC T20 World Cup Qualifier tournament in the United Arab Emirates. In November 2019, he was named in Hong Kong's squad for the Cricket World Cup Challenge League B tournament in Oman.

References

External links

1990 births
Living people
Pakistani emigrants to Hong Kong
Hong Kong cricketers
Hong Kong One Day International cricketers
Hong Kong Twenty20 International cricketers
Cricketers at the 2010 Asian Games
Cricketers from Rawalpindi
Cricketers at the 2014 Asian Games
Sportspeople of Pakistani descent
Asian Games competitors for Hong Kong
Wicket-keepers